Vamsa Vilakku is a 1984 Indian Tamil-language film, directed by R. Krishnamoorthy and produced by S. R. Arulprakasam. The film stars Sivaji Ganesan, K. R. Vijaya, Prabhu and M. N. Nambiar. It is a remake of the Hindi film Vidhaata.

Plot
Sathyam (Sivaji Ganesan) lives with his police inspector son, Shankar (Prabhu), and pregnant daughter-in-law, Padma (Nalini). Shankar attempts to arrest Jaganath (M. N. Nambiar) and is killed in the process. Sathyam kills two of Jaganath's associates in retaliation and is now wanted by the police. As Padma also dies in childbirth, Sathyam takes his grandson Raja and goes on the run. He stumbles upon the attempted murder of notorious smuggler Tiger Baba and rescues him. Tiger Baba takes Sathyam under his wing. Now a rich smuggler known as Chakravarthy, he meets the widowed Thaaiyamma (K. R. Vijaya) and asks her to care for Raja. Worried that his new lifestyle will impact his grandson, Chakravarthy asks Thaaiyamma to raise Raja in Coonoor isolated from him. The two reunite when Raja (also Prabhu) is an adult but he is still unaware of his grandfather's profession. Raja falls in love with Radha (Raadhika), a poor woman who fearless and stands for what's right. Chakravarthy is prejudiced against her poverty and opposes the marriage which sets Raja and Thaaiyamma against him. With Jaganath also re-entering their lives, Chakravarthy faces multiple challenges to avenge his son's murder and reunite with his grandson.

Cast
Sivaji Ganesan as Sathyamoorthy/Chakravarthy
K. R. Vijaya as Thaiyamma
Prabhu as Inspector Shankar and Raja
Raadhika as Radha
M. N. Nambiar as Jaganath
V. K. Ramasamy as Dharma
Major Sundararajan as Tiger Baba
R. N. Sudarshan as Manohar
Nalini in guest appearance as Padma
V. Gopalakrishnan as Ganapathy
Y. G. Mahendran as Peter
Sivachandran as Ravi
Ceylon Manohar

Soundtrack 
The soundtrack was composed by Gangai Amaran.

References

External links
 

1980s Tamil-language films
1984 films
Tamil remakes of Hindi films